The 2022 Inverclyde Council elections took place on 5 May 2022, as part of the 2022 Scottish local elections on the same day as the 31 other Scottish local authorities will be up for election. The election will use the 7 wards created under the Local Governance (Scotland) Act 2004, last changed in 2017, with 22 councillors being elected. Each ward elected either 3 or 4 members, using the STV electoral system. Councillor Lynne Quinn was re-elected with more votes than any candidate in the area with 1,445 first preference votes. 

At the previous election in 2017, the Labour Party won the most seats and formed a minority administration. The same happened at this election in 2022, with Stephen McCabe continuing as leader of the council after the election.

Background

Retiring councillors

Results

Note: "Votes" are the first preference votes. The net gain/loss and percentage changes relate to the result of the previous Scottish local elections on 5 May 2017. This may differ from other published sources showing gain/loss relative to seats held at dissolution of council.

Inverclyde East
2017: 1xCon; 1xSNP; 1xLab 
2022: 1xCon; 1xSNP; 1xLab 
2017-2022: Unchanged.

Inverclyde East Central

Inverclyde Central

Inverclyde North

	

	
	

= Running under The Pensioner's Party

Inverclyde West

Inverclyde South West

Inverclyde South

Aftermath
On 17 May 2022, Labour announced that it had secured enough support from independent councillors to form a new minority administration. Council Leader Stephen McCabe said: "I am delighted that after a week of discussions and negotiations with the other groups on the council I have been able to secure sufficient cross-group support for Inverclyde Labour to lead the next administration." Also, as part of the deal, Drew McKenzie became Inverclyde Council's first Independent Provost, with all previous Provosts being either Labour or Lib Dem councillors.

References

Inverclyde
2022